Steinman Hardware Store is a historic commercial building located at Lancaster, Lancaster County, Pennsylvania. It was built in 1886, and is a three-story, brick and cast iron building in the Queen Anne style.  It features a brick and stone balustrade at the roofline and a cut stone, metal, and stained glass storefront believed to date to 1744.  The Steinman Hardware Store was first located at this site in 1793.

It was listed on the National Register of Historic Places in 1979.

References

Commercial buildings on the National Register of Historic Places in Pennsylvania
Queen Anne architecture in Pennsylvania
Commercial buildings completed in 1886
Buildings and structures in Lancaster, Pennsylvania
Hardware stores of the United States
National Register of Historic Places in Lancaster, Pennsylvania